Paul-Henri Mathieu (born 12 January 1982) is a French former professional tennis player. He won four singles titles on the ATP Tour. His best singles performance in an ATP World Tour Masters 1000 tournament was reaching the semifinals of the 2005 Canadian Open. He achieved a career-high ATP singles ranking of world No. 12 in April 2008.

Tennis career

Formative years
Paul-Henri Mathieu was born in Strasbourg, France. He first began playing tennis when he was three and a half years old with his older brother Pierre-Yves. From 1997 to 2000, Paul-Henri trained at the IMG Bollettieri Tennis Academy in Bradenton, Florida before moving back to Paris.

Juniors
As a junior, Mathieu posted a singles record of 42–15 and a doubles record of 34–12, reaching as high as world no. 6 in singles and world no. 19 in doubles in January 2000. Mathieu won the boys' singles title at the 2000 French Open, defeating Tommy Robredo 3–6, 7–6(7–3), 6–2 in the final.

2000–2004
Mathieu made his ATP World Tour singles main draw debut in July 2000 in the Austrian town of Kitzbühel.

2002 was Mathieu's breakthrough year. He made the fourth round of the French Open, losing to Andre Agassi in five sets, despite having a two-set lead. Later on in the year, he confirmed his potential by winning back-to-back tournaments in Moscow and Lyon. He holds the distinction of being the last player to beat Pete Sampras before his retirement, which he did at the 2002 TD Waterhouse Cup. On 14 October, he became world no. 36, and his progress won him the ATP Newcomer of the Year award for 2002. He also nearly won the Davis Cup in 2002 with the French Davis Cup team, but lost the deciding rubber of the final to Mikhail Youzhny of Russia, once more after relinquishing a two-set advantage.

2005
In 2005, he achieved his best result in an ATP Masters Series event, knocking out Andy Roddick on his way to the semifinals at Montreal. He had a record of 2–2 in the four Davis Cup matches he played that year. He won both his matches against the Swedish opponents Thomas Johansson and Joachim Johansson, but lost to Russia's Nikolay Davydenko and Igor Andreev in the quarterfinal tie.

2006
2006 saw him equal his best result at a Grand Slam tournament by reaching the fourth round of the Australian Open. In May a career-high ranking of no. 32 was attained. In the third round of the French Open, he lost to eventual champion Rafael Nadal in a grueling encounter which lasted 4 hours and 53 minutes, but only saw 42 games played (Nadal won the match 5–7, 6–4, 6–4, 6–4, with the first set lasting 93 minutes and each of the following sets longer than an hour. The score was only 1–1 in the second set after just over 2 hours of play). Many tennis players and commentators, including two-time French Open runner-up Àlex Corretja, hailed it as a classic.

2007
2007 started poorly for Mathieu when he injured himself at the Australian Open during a 1st round encounter against Spaniard Fernando Verdasco and was forced to retire from the match. This was unfortunate as Mathieu was up 2 sets and 3–0 in the 3rd set tiebreak at the time. After returning from his injury, he reached the 4th round in Miami, beating then world number 5 Fernando González of Chile along the way, before bowing out to Andy Murray in 3 sets.

On 29 April 2007, Mathieu won his 3rd career title, the Grand Prix Hassan II in Casablanca defeating Álbert Montañés 6–1, 6–1. At Wimbledon, he reached round 4 for the first time, defeating Radek Štěpánek, No. 17 seed (15th-ranked) David Ferrer, and 15th seed (12th-ranked) Ivan Ljubičić. He attained a career high ranking of 28 in singles after this result, entering the world's top 30 for the first time. The week after Wimbledon, he beat Italian Andreas Seppi 6–7, 6–3, 7–5 in a difficult final to claim his fourth ATP Tour title in Gstaad, Switzerland. He rose to No. 23 in the rankings, making his top 25 breakthrough.

At the Montreal Masters, he produced one of the comebacks of the season to beat 15th seed Guillermo Cañas. Trailing 4–6, 0–4, he managed to up his level of play to win 13 of the next 14 games and record a win by the score of 4–6, 7–5, 6–0. He followed that up with a win over Mario Ančić in round 2. In round 3, he ran into Rafael Nadal, and actually won the first set 6–3 before losing the next two 6–3, 6–2.

He then made the semi-finals of New Haven losing to world number 6 James Blake in a 3rd set tiebreak. This result projected him in the world's top 20 for the 1st time, at the 20th rank.

2012
At the 2012 French Open, Mathieu won his first round match from two sets down before defeating John Isner in five sets, 18–16 in the decider in what proved to be the second longest match in French Open history and fourth longest in Grand Slam history. He lost in the third round to the Spaniard Marcel Granollers.
Mathieu defeated Igor Andreev of Russia in the Swiss Open [6–3, 7–6(4)].

2015

At the 2015 Generali Open Kitzbühel, Mathieu reached the final as a qualifier, after wins over Kenny de Schepper, Martin Kližan, Federico Delbonis and Nicolás Almagro. He lost in the final to Philipp Kohlschreiber 2–6, 6–2, 6–2.

2017

Mathieu played the last singles and doubles match of his career in an ATP World Tour Masters 1000 tournament – the 2017 Rolex Paris Masters. Rank world no. 265 in the ATP singles rankings coming into the tournament, he lost in the second and final singles qualifying round to Vasek Pospisil; he and his partner Benoît Paire lost in the doubles main draw first round to the American pair of Nicholas Monroe and Jack Sock.

Playing style
Mathieu is known for his exceptionally clean groundstrokes on both wings, with his heavy topspin forehand probably being his biggest weapon. His quick hands also enabled him to strike the ball on the rise which frequently took time away from his competitors.

Personal life
Paul-Henri Mathieu's father (Patrick) and mother (Yveline) is a dentist and a housewife respectively. Paul-Henri has a sister named Aude and a brother named Pierre-Yves. A relatively popular, well-liked player despite his inconsistent career results, Mathieu is nicknamed "Paulo" and often affectionately known by his initials, PHM. His favourite surfaces are clay and hard, and he admired Boris Becker while growing up. His brother Pierre-Yves is now a tennis coach in Strasbourg.
 
On 11 March 2012, Paul-Henri Mathieu became a father for the first time when his girlfriend, Quiterie Camus, gave birth to the couple's first child, a son named Gabriel.  On 10 September 2016, Mathieu and Camus married in Bourron-Marlotte's town hall. It was the mother of Camus, being the deputy mayor of Bourron-Marlotte, who performed the wedding ceremony. Mathieu and Quiterie Camus had been living together as a couple for nearly 13 years before their marriage. Quiterie Camus was diagnosed with Hodgkin's lymphoma in January 2013 and she recovered from it before their marriage. Their second child, a daughter named Inès, was born on 6 March 2017.

ATP Tour career finals

Singles: 10 (4 titles, 6 runners-up)

Doubles: 2 (1–1)

ATP Challenger and ITF Futures finals

Singles: 14 (4–10)

Junior Grand Slam finals

Singles: 1 (1 title)

Performance timelines

Singles

Doubles

ATP career earnings

Wins against top-10 players

References

External links
 
 
 
 Bio – File interview with Paul-Henri Mathieu

1982 births
Living people
French male tennis players
French Open junior champions
Olympic tennis players of France
Sportspeople from Strasbourg
Tennis players at the 2008 Summer Olympics
French expatriate sportspeople in Switzerland
Grand Slam (tennis) champions in boys' singles